Polillo is an island in the northeastern region of the Philippine archipelago. It is the largest island and the namesake of the Polillo Islands. It is separated from Luzon Island by the Polillo Strait and forms the northern side of Lamon Bay.

The island itself is subdivided across three municipalities. The municipality of Polillo covers the southern portion of the island, while the northeastern part is administered by the municipality of Burdeos. The northwest is within the jurisdiction of the municipality of Panukulan. The island is also home to the Butaan lizard, a vulnerable relative of the Komodo dragon.

As of the 2010 Philippine Census, the island is home to 64,802 individuals.

In the mid-16th century, Spaniards came to the island and there they built a chapel. They took charge of the management of the island and many changes and development they brought there upon their times.

See also

Burdeos, Quezon
Panukulan, Quezon
Polillo, Quezon

References

External links

Philippine Standard Geographic Code
Philippine Census Information
Wildlife and Conservation in the Polillo Islands

Islands of Quezon